Lophoditta is a monotypic moth genus of the family Erebidae described by Heinrich Benno Möschler in 1890. Its only species, Lophoditta tuberculata, was first described by Gottlieb August Wilhelm Herrich-Schäffer in 1870. It is found in Puerto Rico.

References

Herminiinae
Monotypic moth genera